The Arkansas saddled darter (Etheostoma euzonum) is a species of freshwater ray-finned fish, a darter from the subfamily Etheostomatinae, part of the family Percidae, which also contains the perches, ruffes and pikeperches. It is endemic to the eastern United States, where it occurs in the White River drainage in Arkansas and Missouri. It occurs in deep, fast gravel and rubble riffles of small to medium rivers.

See also 
 Paleback darter: darter endemic to the Caddo River in Arkansas
 Percina brucethompsoni: darter endemic to the Ouachita River in Arkansas

References

Arkansas saddled darter
Fish of the Eastern United States
Freshwater fish of the United States
Endemic fauna of Arkansas
Natural history of Missouri
Arkansas saddled darter
Arkansas saddled darter
Arkansas saddled darter
White River (Arkansas–Missouri)